Cauca Department was one of the departments of Gran Colombia.

It was divided into 4 provinces:
 Popayán Province
 Buenaventura Province
 Chocó Province
 Pasto Province

Departments of Gran Colombia